Kontiolahti (literally meaning "bear bay") is a municipality of Finland. Neighbouring municipalities are Joensuu, Juuka, Lieksa, Liperi and Polvijärvi. The municipality is unilingually Finnish.

Coat of arms of the municipality of Kontiolahti is a canting arms; the log driving pike pole, which the bear carries in the picture, refers to the importance of forestry in the region's economy. The coat of arms was designed by Aarno Liuksiala and approved by the Kontiolahti Municipal Council at its meeting on December 8, 1952. The coat of arms was approved for use by the Ministry of the Interior on February 27, 1953.

Kontiolahti hosted the Biathlon World Championships in 1990, 1999 and 2015.

History
Kontiolahti originally belonged to the parish of Liperi. It became an independent municipality in 1873. The flood nuisance of Lake Höytiäinen and the desire for water abandonment inspired residents to try to build a canal to lower the water level, but the dam broke uncontrollably in 1859, and the landscape changed dramatically. After World War II, the Ruskeala's migrants were stationed in Kontiolahti.

Geography

Kontiolahti has 183 lakes, and water bodies cover 22.3 percent (230 km2) of the municipality's surface area. The largest of them are Lake Höytiäinen, Lake Kangasvesi and Lake Herajärvi. There are 11 Natura sites in all or part of Kontiolahti: Teerisaari-Sisuslahti, Soikkeli Forest, Pöllönvaara-Kruununkangas, Paihola Forest, Kolvananuuro and surrounding areas, Koli National Park, Jouhteninen, Huurunlampi-Sammakkolampi-Huurunrinne and Huuhkajanvaara.

Villages

 Harivaara
 Herajärvi
 Iiksenniitty
 Jakokoski
 Kontiolahti (Kirkonkylä)
 Kontioniemi
 Kulho
 Kunnasniemi
 Kupluskylä
 Kylmäoja
 Lehmo
 Mönni
 Onttola
 Paihola
 Puntarikoski
 Puso
 Pyytivaara
 Rantakylä
 Romppala
 Selkie
 Varparanta
 Venejoki

Transport
Joensuu Region's Public Transport (Joensuun seudun joukkoliikenne; JOJO) is responsible for local and school traffic in the Kontiolahti area. Kontiolahti also has a railway station, which, however, no longer has passenger traffic. Highway 6 passes through the municipality.

Culture

Libraries
Municipal library services are provided by the Kontiolahti Library, the Lehmo Library, and Runo-Antti, the bookmobile of Kontiolahti and Eno.

Food
In the 1980s, Kontiolahti's parish dishes were named "shoemaker's roast" (suutarinpaisti) and stockfish soup.

Notable people 
 Jukka Nevalainen (born 1978), former drummer of Nightwish
 Markku Pölönen (born 1957), film director, screenwriter, editor and owner of film production company Suomen Filmiteollisuus
 Antti Puhakka (1816–1893), national romantic poet

See also 
 Koli National Park
 Pielinen River

References

External links

Municipality of Kontiolahti – Official website, finnish, english, germany and russian
Sirnihta Holiday Villa's

 
Populated places established in 1873
Ski areas and resorts in Finland